Nora Ephron (May 19, 1941 – June 26, 2012) was an American journalist, writer, and filmmaker. She is best known for her romantic comedy films and was nominated three times for the Writers Guild of America Award and the Academy Award for Best Original Screenplay for Silkwood (1983), When Harry Met Sally... (1989), and Sleepless in Seattle (1993). She won the BAFTA Award for Best Original Screenplay for When Harry Met Sally..., which the Writers Guild of America ranked as the 40th greatest screenplay of all time.

Ephron's first produced play, Imaginary Friends (2002), was honored as one of the ten best plays of the 2002–03 New York theatre season. She also co-authored the Drama Desk Award–winning theatrical production Love, Loss, and What I Wore. In 2013, Ephron received a posthumous Tony Award nomination for Best Play for Lucky Guy.

Ephron also directed films, usually from her own screenplays, including Sleepless in Seattle (1993) and You've Got Mail (1998), both starring Meg Ryan and Tom Hanks.

Early life and education
Ephron was born in New York City on May 19, 1941, to a Jewish family. She was the eldest of four daughters, and grew up in Beverly Hills, California. Her parents, Phoebe (née Wolkind) and Henry Ephron, were both East Coast-born and were noted playwrights and screenwriters. Her parents named her Nora after the protagonist in the play A Doll's House by Henrik Ibsen.  Nora's younger sisters, Delia and Amy, are also screenwriters. Her sister Hallie Ephron is a journalist, book reviewer, and novelist who writes crime fiction. Ephron's parents based the ingenue character in the play and film version of Take Her, She's Mine on the 22-year-old Nora and her letters from college; Sandra Dee played the character based on Nora in the film version, with James Stewart portraying her father. Both her parents became alcoholics during their declining years.

As a high school student, Ephron dreamed of going to New York City to become another Dorothy Parker, an American poet, writer, satirist, and critic. Ephron has cited her high school journalism teacher, Charles Simms, as the inspiration for her pursuit of a career in journalism. She graduated from Beverly Hills High School in 1958, and from Wellesley College in Massachusetts, in 1962 with a degree in political science.

Career

Early work 
After graduating from Wellesley College in 1962, Ephron worked briefly as an intern in the White House of President John F. Kennedy. She also applied to be a writer at Newsweek. After she was told they did not hire women writers, she accepted a position as a mail girl.

After eventually quitting Newsweek because she was not allowed to write, Ephron participated in a class action lawsuit against the magazine for sexual discrimination, described in the book The Good Girls Revolt: How the Women of Newsweek Sued Their Bosses and Changed the Workplace by Lynn Povich, and both the lawsuit and Ephron's role were fictionalized in a 2016 Amazon series by the similar main title Good Girls Revolt.

After a satire in Monocle she wrote lampooning the New York Post caught the editor's eye, Ephron accepted a job at the Post, where she worked as a reporter for five years. In 1966, she broke the news in the Post that Bob Dylan had married Sara Lownds in a private ceremony. Upon becoming a successful writer, she wrote a column on women's issues for Esquire. In this position, Ephron made a name for herself by writing "A Few Words About Breasts," a humorous essay about body image that "established her as the enfant terrible of the New Journalism." While at Esquire, she took on subjects as wide-ranging as Dorothy Schiff, her former boss and owner of the Post; Betty Friedan, whom she chastised for pursuing a feud with Gloria Steinem; and her alma mater Wellesley, which she said had turned out "a generation of docile and unadventurous women." A 1968 send-up of Women's Wear Daily that she wrote for Cosmopolitan resulted in threats of a lawsuit from WWD.

Ephron rewrote a script for All the President's Men in the mid-1970s, along with her then husband, investigative journalist Carl Bernstein. While the script was not used, it was seen by someone who offered Ephron her first screenwriting job, for a television movie, which began her screenwriting career.

1980s 
In 1983, Ephron co-scripted the film Silkwood with Alice Arlen. The film, directed by Mike Nichols, stars Meryl Streep as Karen Silkwood, a whistleblower at the Kerr McGee Cimarron nuclear facility who dies under suspicious circumstances. Ephron and Arlen were nominated for the Best Original Screenplay Oscar in 1984 for Silkwood.

Ephron's novel Heartburn was published in 1983. The novel is a semi-autobiographical account of her marriage with Carl Bernstein. The film adaptation was released in 1986, directed by Mike Nichols starring Meryl Streep and Jack Nicholson. Ephron adapted her own novel into the screenplay for the film. In the film, Ephron's fictionalized portrayal of herself, played by Streep, is a pregnant food writer when she learns about her husband's affair.

Ephron wrote the script for the romantic comedy When Harry Met Sally... in 1986. The film, released in 1989, was directed by Rob Reiner, starred Billy Crystal and Meg Ryan. The film depicts the decade-long relationship between Harry (Crystal) and Sally (Ryan) as they navigate their own romantic relationships. Ephron has claimed that she wrote this screenplay with Reiner in mind as the character of Harry, and herself as the character of Sally. The film has become iconic in the romantic comedy genre, most notably for the scene in which Sally pretends to have an orgasm in the middle of Katz's Deli during lunch. Ephron said she wrote the part of Sally simulating an orgasm into the script per Meg Ryan's suggestions. Additionally, the comment "I'll have what she's having" said by a deli patron (played by Rob Reiner's real-life mother Estelle Reiner) watching the scene unfold nearby, was an idea from Billy Crystal. Ephron's script was nominated for the 1990 Oscar in Best Writing, Screenplay Written Directly for the Screen.

1990s 
Ephron's directorial debut was the 1992 film This Is My Life. Ephron and her sister Delia Ephron wrote the script based on Meg Wolitzer's novel This is Your Life. The film is about a woman who decides to pursue a career in stand-up comedy after inheriting a substantial sum of money from a relative. In a conversation released by Criterion Channel between Lena Dunham, and Ephron, she stated "That movie I made completely for Woody Allen." She later stated in the conversation that he saw it and liked it.

In 1993, Ephron directed and wrote the script for the romantic comedy Sleepless in Seattle. The film stars Tom Hanks as Sam Baldwin, a recently widowed father whose son calls into a Chicago-based radio talk show in an attempt to find his father a new partner. After hearing this call, Baltimore resident Annie Reed, played by Meg Ryan, becomes infatuated with Sam, and sets up a rendezvous for the two to meet in New York City.

In 1994, she was awarded the Women in Film Crystal Award.

In 1998, Ephron released the film You've Got Mail, which she wrote the script for, with her sister Delia Ephron, and directed. The story is a loose adaptation of the Ernst Lubitsch film from 1940 The Shop Around the Corner. You've Got Mail stars Meg Ryan as Kathleen Kelly, an owner of a small, independent children's bookstore in New York City. Her quiet life is then threatened by Fox Books, a Barnes & Noble-esque book selling chain, which opens near her shop. Fox Books is run by Joe Fox, played by Tom Hanks. Joe and Kathleen navigate a tumultuous business rivalry, while unknowingly forming an intimate connection with each other via email.

2000s 
In 2007, Ephron received the Golden Plate Award of the American Academy of Achievement presented by Awards Council member George Lucas.

In 2009, Ephron directed and co-wrote the screenplay for Julie & Julia. The film is based on Julie Powell's blog and memoir of the same title. The film is about Julia Child, the famous American chef played by Meryl Streep, and Julie Powell, a New Yorker attempting to cook her way through Child's cookbook, played by Amy Adams. As Powell blogs her experience, the film flashes back to the story of Child's first stages of her career as she trains in a French culinary school. The film was a commercial success.

Ephron's 2002 play Imaginary Friends explores the rivalry between writers Lillian Hellman and Mary McCarthy. She co-authored the play Love, Loss, and What I Wore (based on the book by Ilene Beckerman) with her sister Delia, and it has played to sold-out audiences in Canada, New York City and Los Angeles.

Personal life 
Ephron was married three times. Her first marriage, to writer Dan Greenburg, ended in divorce after nine years. In 1976, she married journalist Carl Bernstein. In 1979, Ephron had a toddler son, Jacob, and was pregnant with her second son Max when she discovered Bernstein's affair with their mutual friend, married British journalist Margaret Jay, daughter of former British prime minister James Callaghan and at the time wife of the British ambassador to the United States. Ephron was inspired by this to write the 1983 novel Heartburn, which was then made into a 1986 Mike Nichols film starring Jack Nicholson and Meryl Streep. In the book, Ephron wrote of a husband named Mark, who was "capable of having sex with a Venetian blind." She also wrote that the character Thelma (based on Margaret Jay) looked like a giraffe with "big feet". Bernstein threatened to sue over the book and film, but never did.

Ephron was married for more than 20 years to screenwriter Nicholas Pileggi, from 1987 until her death in 2012. The couple lived in the Hollywood Hills in Los Angeles, and in New York City.

Ephron's friend Richard Cohen said of her, "She was very Jewish, culturally and emotionally. She identified fully as a Jewish woman." However, Ephron was not religious. "You can never have too much butter – that is my belief. If I have a religion, that's it", she quipped in an NPR interview about her 2009 movie Julie & Julia.

Ephron's son, Jacob Bernstein, directed an HBO movie on her life titled Everything Is Copy. As of 2021, he is a reporter for The New York Times.

For many years, Ephron was one of the very few people who knew the identity of Deep Throat, the anonymous informer for articles written by her ex-husband Carl Bernstein and Bob Woodward uncovering the Watergate scandal. Ephron read Bernstein's notes, which referred to Deep Throat as "MF"; Bernstein said it stood for "My Friend," but Ephron correctly guessed it stood for Mark Felt, the former associate director of the FBI.

After Ephron's marriage with Bernstein ended, Ephron revealed Deep Throat's identity to her son Jacob and anyone else who asked. She once said, "I would give speeches to 500 people and someone would say, 'Do you know who Deep Throat is?' And I would say, 'It's Mark Felt.'" Classmates of Jacob Bernstein at the Dalton School and Vassar College recall Jacob's revealing to numerous people that Felt was Deep Throat. This revelation attracted little media attention during the many years that the identity of Deep Throat was a mystery. Ephron said, "No one, apart from my sons, believed me." Ephron was invited by Arianna Huffington to write about the experience in The Huffington Post, for which she was a regular blogger and part-time editor.

Death
In 2006, Ephron was diagnosed with myelodysplasia. She chose not to disclose her diagnosis to friends or colleagues, fearing that the knowledge that she was ill would have impeded her career, and would make it impossible to get projects financed or insured. On June 26, 2012, Ephron died at Weill Cornell Medical Center in Manhattan from pneumonia, as a complication of leukemia, at the age of 71.

Ephron's memorial service at Alice Tully Hall at Lincoln Center in New York City was attended by Meryl Streep, Tom Hanks, Billy Crystal, Meg Ryan, Rob Reiner, Barbara Walters, Diane Sawyer, Steven Spielberg, Martin Scorsese, Woody Allen, Alan Alda, Steve Martin, Martin Short, Lorne Michaels, Larry David, Joy Behar, Rosie O'Donnell, Annette Bening, Matthew Broderick, Nicole Kidman, Michael Bloomberg, Charlie Rose, Ron Howard, and Gayle King, among others.

At that year's Karlovy Vary Film Festival, actresses Helen Mirren and Susan Sarandon, who were honored with lifetime achievement awards, paid tribute to Ephron during their acceptance speeches.

Lena Dunham's 2014 memoir Not That Kind of Girl and Steven Spielberg's 2017 film The Post are both dedicated to Ephron.

Legacy
The Nora Ephron Prize is a $25,000 award by the Tribeca Film Festival for a female writer or filmmaker "with a distinctive voice". The first Nora Ephron Prize was awarded in 2013 to Meera Menon for her film Farah Goes Bang.

Filmography

Feature films
As an actress, Nora Ephron appeared in two films, both made by her friend Woody Allen.She is credited as being a wedding guest in Crimes and Misdemeanors (1989), as a Dinner Party Guest in Husbands and Wives (1992).

Plays

Bibliography 

 Wallflower at the Orgy (1970)
 Crazy Salad: Some Things About Women (1975), 
 The Boston Photographs (1975)
 Scribble, Scribble: Notes on the Media (1978), 
 Heartburn (1983, a novel)
 I Feel Bad About My Neck: And Other Thoughts on Being a Woman (2006)
 I Remember Nothing: And Other Reflections (2010)
 The Most of Nora Ephron (2013), 
 
———————
Notes

Awards and nominations

Other Awards

References

External links

 WNED Public Television (November 17, 1975), Interview with Nora Ephron for WNED's series "Woman"
 
 
 
 
 
 
 
 
 
 
 
 Neri Livneh (July 5, 2012), "Neri Livneh salutes her heroine, Nora Ephron"
 "Plays by Nora Ephron" . Doollee.
 Nora Ephron Video produced by Makers: Women Who Make America
 Movie clips: , compilation, 5 min.

1941 births
2012 deaths
20th-century American essayists
20th-century American journalists
20th-century American novelists
20th-century American women writers
21st-century American Jews
21st-century American non-fiction writers
21st-century American women writers
American bloggers
American women bloggers
American women essayists
American women film directors
American women film producers
American women journalists
American women novelists
American women screenwriters
Best Original Screenplay BAFTA Award winners
Beverly Hills High School alumni
Comedy film directors
Deaths from cancer in New York (state)
Deaths from leukemia
Deaths from pneumonia in New York City
Nora
Esquire (magazine) people
Film directors from Los Angeles
Film directors from New York City
Film producers from California
Film producers from New York (state)
Jewish American journalists
Jewish American novelists
Jewish women writers
Journalists from New York City
New York (magazine) people
New York Post people
The New Yorker people
Novelists from New York (state)
People from the Upper East Side
People from the Upper West Side
Screenwriters from California
Screenwriters from New York (state)
Wellesley College alumni
Writers from Manhattan